Maryport is a small town in Cumbria, England.

Maryport may also refer to:

 Maryport, Dumfries and Galloway, Scotland (on Luce Bay)
 Maryport railway station a railway station serving Maryport, Cumbria, England